The Crawford Texas Peace House is an anti-war activist organization located in Crawford, Texas near the home of President George W. Bush.  It gained international attention in August 2005 during the protest of Cindy Sheehan, who is listed as serving on the board of directors.

In March 2007, it came to light that the Crawford Peace House had lost its corporate charter due to the required paperwork not being submitted to the state since May 2006. In addition, former Peace House member Sara Oliver claims that several hundreds of thousands of dollars in donations are unaccounted for. Oliver now holds the right to use the group's name, and is demanding an investigation. The name was then changed to the Crawford Texas Peace House.

Peace House co-founder John Wolf states that $285,000 was raised in 2005, and was spent legitimately.

References

External links
 Crawford Peace House official site

Video
 Interview with Crawford Peace House co-founder and spokesperson Hadi Jawad, from 19 August 2005 Democracy Now program

Anti–Iraq War groups
Corporate scandals
Organizations based in Texas
2003 establishments in Texas
Organizations established in 2003